Wish is the second solo album of former Undertones singer Feargal Sharkey. Released in 1988, three years after his successful self-titled solo debut, the album was considered to be somewhat disappointing and was not as successful as its predecessor.

Background
Upon release, Sharkey told the Sunday Independent: "I've never devoted myself so much to an album before, so if it comes out, and nobody gives a damn about it, I would be extremely disappointed, to say the least."

"Blue Days" was inspired by The Troubles in Northern Ireland. Sharkey told the Sunday Independent: "It's about my last return to Derry, and how soul-destroying I found it, seeing what living there has done to all my old friends." He added to Record Mirror: "I wrote the song because I believe that at the end of the day, despite sectarian differences, nobody is happy with what's going on in Ireland." The title was inspired by Rev Ian Paisley's comment: "We will never forsake the blue skies of Ulster for the grey mists of an Irish republic."

Critical reception

Upon release, John Aizlewood of Number One said: "So why is our Fearg hitless? One things for sure, it can't be the music. Wish is a steady grower which creeps up on you like exams, only it's fun to listen to! And does that voice fair quiver? It does indeed. Nice one Fearg, ignore the barrackers." Billboard described the album as an "even-better follow-up" to Sharkey's debut, and one that "should soon be sitting firmly at the top of the charts". Cash Box described the album as "a slickly-crafted collection of pop numbers that should finally enable the artist the edge at Top 40 radio he deserves"

Stereo Review commented: "The first solo album by Feargal Sharkey was so subtle and understated that much of it barely registered. This time around, he's made a record that cannot go unnoticed. With the help of producer Danny Kortchmar, whose guitar playing is the instrumental heart of the album, Sharkey takes a measured soul turn." The reviewer praised five of the album's tracks as "gems", but then added the rest of material "gets thin". They concluded: "Five out of the ten tracks are hardly memorable, but the good ones are very good".

Track listing

The CD release contains three changes to the track listing

Charts

Personnel
Feargal Sharkey - vocals
Beverly D'Angelo - backing vocals (6)
Charley Drayton - guitar, backing vocals (10)
Mike Finnigan - organ (2)
Bob Glaub - bass (2, 8)
Mark Goldenberg - organ, synthesizer, guitar (9)
Steve Jordan - drums (1-10)
Danny Kortchmar - guitar (1-10), bass (1, 3, 7, 8)
Russ Kunkel - percussion (4)
David Lasley - backing vocals (1-3, 5-7, 9)
Maggie Lee - synthesizer, backing vocals (6)
Arnold McCuller - backing vocals (1-3, 6, 7, 9)
David Paich - synthesizer, piano (4)
Keith Richards - guitar (2)
Jack Sherman - electric 12-string (6)
Leland Sklar - bass (4, 6)
Myna Smith Schilling - backing vocals (5)
Benmont Tench - organ (2, 5, 7)
Waddy Wachtel - guitar (2, 4, 6, 8)
Jimmy “Z” Zavala - saxophone (2), harmonica (2)
Anthony J. Davies - backing vocals (all), cello (4), keyboards (7,9), dube (3)
Technical
Richard Haughton - photography
Gary Wathen - art direction

References

1988 albums
Feargal Sharkey albums
Albums produced by Danny Kortchmar
Virgin Records albums